Nova Cinema is a Czech free digital television channel in the Czech Republic, owned and operated by CME, and a sister channel of TV Nova.

The channel broadcasts various films (thematically categorized from genres: crime, action, drama, comedy, horror, thriller to romantic, sci-fi, family or Czech films, fantasy), or showbiz shows like Red Carpet Reporter ("Hvězdy červeného koberce") and Hollywood Reporter ("Hollywoodský zpravodaj").

The channel is available through satellite, cable, IPTV and since 15 December 2008 in DVB-T multiplex 2.

Filmy

Action, Crime, Horror, Sci-Fi, Thriller 

 Detective Pikachu
 Elektra
 Godzilla
 Guardians of the Galaxy
 Hancock
 Inferno
 Iron Man
 Jumper
 Jurassic World
 Killing season
 The Great Wall
 Troy
 A History of Violence
 Inherent Vice
 Joker
 Annabelle: Creation
 Annabelle
 Final Destination 3
 Halloween
 It
 It Chapter Two
 Rest Stop
 Rest Stop: Don't Look Back
 Texas Chainsaw 3D
 The Exorcist
 The Lazarus Effect
 The Nun
 The Unborn
 The Wolfman
 Wolves at the Door
 Black Panther
 Blade Runner
 Green Lantern
 Guardians of the Galaxy Vol. 2
 Matrix
 Matrix Reloaded
 Matrix Revolutions
 Midnight Special
 Tomorrowland
 X-Men
 Angels & Demons
 Contagion
 Instinct
 Jaws
 Jaws 2
 Nocturnal Animals
 Wild Things: Foursome

Adventures, Western 

 G-Force
 King Kong
 Superman Returns
 White Fang
 High Plains Drifter
 The Salvation
 Unforgiven

Family, Comedy 

 Cinderella
 American Pie Presents: Band Camp
 Analyze This
 Bean
 Bring It On: Fight to the Finish
 Bring It On: In It to Win It
 Bring It On: Worldwide Cheersmack
 Casper
 Crazy, Stupid Love
 For a Good Time, Call...
 Jack Frost
 Kangaroo Jack
 Problem Child
 Problem Child 2
 Scooby-Doo
 Scooby-Doo 2: Monsters Unleashed
 Sisters
 Ted 2

Drama, Romance, Musical, Fantasy 

 Argo
 American History X
 Anna Karenina
 Catwoman
 Cinderella Man
 Coach Carter
 Eyes Wide Shut
 Flipped
 Scarface
 The Fan
 The Finest Hours
 La La Land
 Aladdin
 Constantine
 Coraline
 Maleficent: Mistress of Evil

Animation Films 

 A Bug's Life
 A Christmas Carol
 Antz
 Brave
 Brother Bear
 Captain Underpants: The First Epic Movie
 Cars
 Cars 2
 Cars 3
 Chicken Little
 Coco
 DC Super Hero Girls: Legends of Atlantis
 Despicable Me 2
 Finding Dory
 Frozen
 Frozen 2
 Happy Feet
 Home
 Incredibles 2
 Legend of the Guardians: The Owls of Ga'Hoole
 Moana
 Monsters University
 ParaNorman
 Peter Pan
 Peter Rabbit
 Planes: Fire & Rescue
 Ralph Breaks the Internet
 Return to Never Land
 Teen Titans Go! To the Movies
 The Adventures of Rocky and Bullwinkle
 The Ant Bully
 The Boss Baby
 The Jungle Book 2
 The Lego Ninjago Movie
 The Polar Express
 The Princess and the Frog
 The Wild
 Treasure Planet
 Up
 Wreck-It Ralph

Czech Films 

 Kajínek

Programming

Series 

 Cold Case
 Dr. House
 Elementary
 Monk
 The Mentalist

References

Television stations in the Czech Republic
Television channels and stations established in 2007
Czech-language television stations
Movie channels in the Czech Republic
TV Nova (Czech Republic)